Càrn Dearg is the highest peak of the Monadh Liath mountains in the Highlands of Scotland. Its eastern flanks slope steeply down into Glen Ballach, while to the north, the large plateau of the Monadh Liath extends for many miles. The nearest settlements are Newtonmore and Kingussie in the Spey valley. The rocky slopes of Carn Dearg and A' Chailleach contrast with the remainder of the Monadh Liath, which are described by Cameron McNeish as "sprawling, undistinguished affairs .

References

Munros
Marilyns of Scotland
Mountains and hills of the Central Highlands
Mountains and hills of Highland (council area)